Petter Løvik (11 July 1949 – 3 December 2007) was a Norwegian politician for the Conservative Party.

He was elected to the Norwegian Parliament from Møre og Romsdal in 1997 and was re-elected on two occasions. He had previously served in the position of deputy representative during the terms 1989–1993 and 1993–1997.

Løvik was born in Volda and held various positions in Volda municipality council from 1979 to 1997. From 1987 to 1991 he was deputy member of Møre og Romsdal county council.

He died from cancer in December 2007 at the age of 58.

References

1949 births
2007 deaths
Conservative Party (Norway) politicians
Members of the Storting
Deaths from cancer in Norway
21st-century Norwegian politicians
20th-century Norwegian politicians
People from Volda